Zhang Doudou (born July 23, 1996) is a retired Chinese rhythmic gymnast from Taiyuan, Shanxi, China. In 2013, she won the 6th on the World Rhythmic Gymnastics Championships. In January 2014, she was assessed as "International Sports Master" by State General Administration of Sports.

She retired in August 2017.

Career 
In August 2006, Zhang Doudou competed in the National Championships of Rhythmic Gymnastics for Teenagers as a member of Shanxi's team in Zhuhai.

In October 2009, she competed in the 11th National Games of China in Dezhou. In hoop gymnastics, she ranked fourth, and in ball gymnastics, she ranked fifth.

In September 2013, Zhang Doudou competed in the 12th National Games of China in Shenyang, and ranked 6th of Group All-Around as a member of Shanxi's team. After that, she won an award named "Sportsman of the Year".

In April 2015, Zhang Doudou competed in the 2015 National Champtionships of Rhythmic Gymnastics in Xi'an. In September, she competed in World Rhythmic Gymnastics Championships in Stuttgart.

In August 2017, she competed in the 13th National Games of China with Zhao Yating as members of Shanxi's team, and Zhang Doudou ranked 8th. She retired after the competition. After retirement, she became a coach of the National Rhythmic Gymnast Team.

In March 2019, Zhang obtained the Olimpic Flame of the Second National Youth Games.

Personal statistics

Awards

References 

Chinese rhythmic gymnasts
1996 births
Sportspeople from Taiyuan
Living people
Gymnasts from Shanxi
21st-century Chinese women